This article contains information about the literary events and publications of 1828.

Events
January – Thomas Dale becomes the first university professor of English language and literature, at the new London University.
January 1 – John Neal launches The Yankee literary journal.
January 6 – William Lamb, the future Lord Melbourne, writes to his estranged wife, Lady Caroline Lamb, from Ireland, regretting that official duties make it impossible to visit her immediately. Later in the month, he makes the sea crossing arriving at her bedside shortly before her death.
February 21 – The Cherokee Phœnix, the earliest newspaper published by Native Americans in the United States and in one of their indigenous languages, (Cherokee), is first issued in New Echota.
April 1 – The Athenæum, "London Literary and Critical Journal", is launched by James Silk Buckingham.
December – Nikolai Gogol leaves school and goes to Saint Petersburg.
unknown dates
Sherman Converse publishes Noah Webster's 70,000 word American Dictionary of the English Language.
Elizabeth Caroline Grey's The Skeleton Count, or The Vampire Mistress is published; it is considered by some to be the first vampire story by a woman author.
John Payne Collier produces a script of Punch and Judy.
The Reclam publishing company is established in Leipzig by Anton Philipp Reclam.
Færøernes Amts Bibliotek, the National Library of the Faroe Islands, is established.

New books

Fiction
Steen Steensen Blicher – Sildig Opvaagnen
Anna Eliza Bray – The White Hoods: an Historical Romance
John Benjamin Brookes (published anonymously) – The Lustful Turk
Edward Bulwer-Lytton 
 The Disowned
 Pelham
George Croly – Salathiel
Selina Davenport – Italian Vengeance and English Forbearance
Thomas Gaspey – The History of George Godfrey
Léon Gozlan – Les Mémoires d'un apothécaire
Elizabeth Caroline Grey – De Lisle
Gerald Griffin – The Collegians
Ann Hatton – Uncle Peregrine's Heiress
Nathaniel Hawthorne – Fanshawe
Robert Huish – The Red Barn
Bernhard Severin Ingemann – Erik Menveds Barndom (Erik Menved's Childhood)
 Thomas Henry Lister – Herbert Lacy
Jane C. Loudon – The Mummy!
John Neal – Rachel Dyer: a North American Story
 Lord Normanby – Yes and No
T. J. Llewelyn Prichard – The Adventures and Vagaries of Twm Shon Catti, descriptive of life in Wales; interspersed with poems
Susanna Rowson – Lucy Temple
Sir Walter Scott – The Fair Maid of Perth (or St. Valentine's Day; Chronicles of the Canongate, 2nd series)
Rosalia St. Clair – Ulrica of Saxony

Drama
Alfred de Vigny – Roméo et Juliette and Shylock (adaptations from Shakespeare, published)
Franz Grillparzer – Ein Treuer Diener
Johan Ludvig Heiberg – Elves' Hill (Elverhøi)
Henrik Hertz – Flyttedagen
Victor Hugo – Amy Robsart
 James Sheridan Knowles – The Beggar's Daughter of Bethnal Green
Mary Russell Mitford – Rienzi
 Richard Brinsley Peake – The Haunted Inn
Jovan Sterija Popović – Miloš Obilić
Émile Souvestre – Siege de Missolonghi
Gotthilf August von Maltitz – Hans Kohlhaas

Poetry
Adam Mickiewicz – Konrad Wallenrod

Non-fiction
August Böckh (editor) – Corpus Inscriptionum Graecum (begins publication)
George Combe – The Constitution of Man
Barbara Hofland – Africa Described, in Its Ancient and Present State
Washington Irving – A History of the Life and Voyages of Christopher Columbus

Births
January 2 – Frederic Charles Lascelles Wraxall, English writer (died 1865)
January 15 – Mary Jane Katzmann, Canadian writer, editor, and historian (died 1890)
January 22 – Dora d'Istria, Romanian-Albanian writer (died 1888)
February 8 – Jules Verne, French novelist and science fiction writer (died 1905)
February 12 – George Meredith, English novelist and poet (died 1909)
February 14 – Edmond About, French novelist and journalist (died 1885)
February 16 – Julia Colman, American writer, educator, activist, and editor  (died 1909)
March 20 – Henrik Johan Ibsen, Norwegian dramatist (died 1906)
April 1 – Lucinda Banister Chandler, American author and reformer (died 1911)
April 1 – George Barbu Știrbei, Romanian journalist, biographer and patron of the arts (died 1925)
April 4 – Margaret Oliphant, Scottish novelist and historical writer (died 1897)
May 12 – Dante Gabriel Rossetti, English poet and artist (died 1882)
August 9 – B. Beaumont, British author and businesswoman (died 1892)
August 24 – Gheorghe Chițu, Romanian classical scholar, publisher and journalist (died 1897)
September 9 – Leo Tolstoy, Russian novelist (died 1910)
September 17 – Louise Flodin, Swedish journalist (died 1923)
October 8 – Francisque Sarcey, French journalist and critic (died 1899)
October 10 – Harriet Newell Kneeland Goff, American author and reformer (died 1901)
November 14 – Susannah V. Aldrich, American author and hymnwriter  (died 1905)
unknown date – Charlotte Chanter, English botanical writer and novelist (died 1882)

Deaths
January 5 – Kobayashi Issa (小林 一茶), Japanese haiku poet (born 1763)
January 16 – Johann Samuel Ersch, German bibliographer (born 1766)
January 26 – Lady Caroline Lamb, English novelist (born 1785)
February 7 – Henry Neele, English poet and scholar (born 1798)
February 29 – Henry Beekman Livingston, American poet (born 1748)
March 16 – Johann Georg August Galletti, German historian (born 1750)
March 28 – Frances Burney, English dramatist (born 1776)
April 7 – Helena Charlotta Åkerhielm, Swedish dramatist and translator  (born 1786)
April 25 – François-Benoît Hoffman, French dramatist and critic (born 1760)
May 28 – Anne Seymour Damer, English sculptor and novelist (born 1748)
June 8 – William Coxe, English historian and travel writer (born 1747)
June 11 – Dugald Stewart, Scottish Enlightenment philosopher (born 1753)
June 21 – Leandro Fernández de Moratín, Spanish dramatist and poet (born 1760)
August 10 – William Cardell, American grammarian and story writer for boys (born 1780)
October 13 – Vincenzo Monti, Italian poet and dramatist (born 1754)
November 8 – Thomas Bewick, English writer and natural historian (born 1753)

References

 
Years of the 19th century in literature